Margalef is a village in Catalonia, Spain. It is situated on the edge of Montsant and is a popular ecotourism destination, especially among rock climbers. The rock type is conglomerate and it has more than 500 climbing routes of different grades, from 4 to 9b+. Many of the buildings in the village are also built on conglomerate formations.

Margalef's important economic activity is agriculture, mainly producing olives, almonds, and fruits.

References

External links
 
 Government data pages 
 All about rock climbing in Margalef

Municipalities in Priorat
Populated places in Priorat
Climbing areas of Spain